The Ventriloquist is the name of multiple supervillains appearing in American comic books and other media published by DC Comics. All of the Ventriloquist's versions are enemies of Batman, belonging to the collective of adversaries that make up Batman's rogues gallery.

The character has been featured in various media adaptations, such as feature films, television series and video games. Andrew Sellon portrays a new version of the character in the television series Gotham. In the fifth season, he finds the dummy Scarface and becomes the Ventriloquist.

Publication history
There are currently three incarnations of the Ventriloquist: the first and original incarnation, Arnold Wesker, first appeared in Detective Comics #583 (February 1988) and was created by John Wagner, Alan Grant, and Norm Breyfogle; the second Ventriloquist, Peyton Riley, was introduced in Detective Comics #827 (March 2007) by Paul Dini and Don Kramer; in September 2011, The New 52 rebooted DC's continuity and, in this new timeline, the third and final incarnation of the character was introduced, Shauna Belzer, first appearing in Batgirl #20 (July 2013), as created by Gail Simone and Fernando Pasarin.

Fictional character biography

Arnold Wesker
A meek, quiet man named Arnold Wesker (the first Ventriloquist) plans and executes his crimes through a dummy named Scarface, with the dress and persona of a 1920s gangster (complete with pinstripe suit, cigar, and Tommy gun). His name comes from the nickname of Al Capone, after whom Scarface is modeled. Born into a powerful organized crime family, Wesker develops dissociative identity disorder after seeing his mother assassinated by thugs from a rival family. Growing up, his only outlet is ventriloquism.

Showcase '94 #8-9 establishes an alternate origin story: after a barroom brawl in which he kills someone during a violent release of his repressed anger, Wesker is sent to Blackgate Penitentiary. He is introduced to "Woody" — a dummy carved from the remains of the former Blackgate gallows by his cellmate Donnegan — who convinces him to escape and kill Donnegan in a fight which scars the dummy, thus resulting in the birth of Scarface. Wesker lets the Scarface personality do the dirty work, including robbery and murder. He is totally dominated by Scarface, who barks orders at him and degrades him with verbal (and even physical) abuse. Wesker is unable to enunciate the letter "B" in his words while throwing his voice and replaces them with the letter "G" instead (for example, Scarface often calls Batman and Robin "Gatman" and "Rogin").

In the 1995 Riddler story Riddler: The Riddle Factory, it is revealed that a gangster named "Scarface" Scarelli had once been active in Gotham City, though he had apparently died long before Batman's era. A supernatural aspect to Scarface was hinted at in Wesker's alternate origin story in Showcase '94 #8-9, when Wesker's cellmate creates the first Scarface dummy from pieces of wood from the remains of Blackgate Prison's gallows. Batman/Scarface: A Psychodrama (2001) reinforces this and shows the dummy to be indirectly responsible for two accidents while separated from Wesker (with at least one fatality). The dummy also retained his speech impediment while operated by a young boy and seemed to even show awareness of his name during this period.

The Ventriloquist is one of many villains in the Batman's rogues gallery to be confined to Arkham Asylum when Batman apprehends him. One particularly memorable series of events concerning him took place during the Knightfall storyline, after Bane had destroyed Arkham and released its inmates. Unable to find Scarface, the Ventriloquist uses a sock puppet in his place for a short time (aptly named Socko). After an ill-fated team-up with fellow escapee Amygdala, he procures a number of other hand puppets to fill in for Scarface, including one of a police officer which he refers to as "Chief O'Hara". Later, when Wesker does indeed find Scarface, Scarface and Socko are set at odds until a standoff occurs and the dummy and the puppet both shoot each other, leaving Wesker unconscious and bleeding from two wounded hands.

During the events of the Cataclysm story arc, the stress caused by the earthquake apparently triggered the release of another personality within Wesker in the form of the Quakemaster, who claimed to have caused the earthquake himself over a video and threatened to trigger another unless he was paid $100 million. However, the seismologist Quakemaster had captured to provide him with information deliberately feeds him inaccurate scientific data to provide detectives looking for her with information as to her location. Robin subsequently deduces 'Quakemaster's' true identity, due to his speeches always taking great effort to avoid saying any words with the letter "B". In one issue, Wesker is apparently killed, and in a bizarre twist, Scarface appears to still talk and act alive before he is destroyed. This death appears to have been retconned in "One Year Later" (presumably due to the events of the Infinite Crisis crossover event). Wesker appears as one of the members of the Secret Society of Super Villains that faces the Jade Canary, who pitches Scarface off the top of a roof.

In Detective Comics #818, an issue later included in the trade paperback Batman: Face the Face, Wesker is murdered by an unseen assailant. The dummy Scarface is stepped on and its head crushed. The dying Wesker uses Scarface's hand to leave a clue regarding his murder: a street name. Later in the storyline, it is revealed that the Tally Man II, acting as an enforcer for the Great White Shark, is responsible for the murder. During the Blackest Night crossover, Wesker is among the many deceased villains that receive a black power ring and is reanimated into a Black Lantern. Using his power ring, Wesker creates a construct of Scarface made of black energy. He is shown murdering many police officers.

In September 2011, The New 52 rebooted DC's continuity. In this new timeline, Arnold Wesker was never killed. He appears in Batman: The Dark Knight (vol. 2) #2. Implied to be in possession of the Venom steroid, he clashes briefly with Nightwing.

During The War of Jokes and Riddles, Wesker and Scarface are seen as part of the Joker's gang in his gang war against the Riddler's gang. In Harley Quinn: Rebirth, after turning on the Penguin, the Ventriloquist and Scarface join up with the few remaining crime lords of New York that managed to escape from the Penguin's giant penguins and they help Harley Quinn to fight back. Afterwards, he is put in charge of Coney Island's Mafia.

Peyton Riley

A new female Ventriloquist, Peyton Riley, called "Sugar" by Scarface, soon surfaced in the pages of Detective Comics. Batman responded to a police scanner call - witnesses said Catwoman had been shot. He got to the body, which had a note on it that read "dummy." A counter started at four seconds - he got out as the place exploded. When he got back to his car, there was a dummy posing as Robin. He shot it with a grapple and it, too, exploded.

Batman had the police exhume Arnold Wesker's body, but the coffin was empty. Bruce uses one of his disguises, small-timer Lefty Knox, to see what the underground was saying. Within a week, he heard the Ventriloquist was making a comeback at the Iceberg Lounge. "Lefty" attended the big show - as the curtains parted, the deceased Wesker sat with Scarface in his lap. A beautiful blonde whom Scarface calls "Sugar" knocked over the dead body, picked up the dummy, and continued on. When she was questioned by an audience member, she shot him. Scarface told the room he was working on a plan to take over the city, but would have to remove Batman from the equation first. He called Batman out, knowing that he would be in the audience. Bruce threw his voice and made it look like one of the other criminals was confessing. A batarang flew and took out the lights, causing Scarface to open fire. Batman swooped in and grabbed the woman and the dummy. He separated them and realized the dummy was a bomb, forcing him to dispose of it and allowing the woman to escape. Batman then informed Gordon of what had happened.

Sugar is a more compatible partner than Wesker, since Scarface no longer substitutes "B" with "G", and she is far more willing to commit violent crime. When nearly captured by Batman and Harley Quinn (who had been close to Wesker after he tried to cheer her up when she was initially sent to Arkham while the Joker was still on the loose), Sugar has Scarface say, "Save yourself." Unlike Wesker, who is horrified at any damage to Scarface, Sugar rigs her dummies to explode, using this to cover her escapes. She has numerous identical dummies at her hideout, easily switching from one Scarface to another as needed.

During Gotham Underground #2 (January 2008), Sugar and Scarface, along with Lock-Up, the Firefly, and Killer Moth are told by the Scarecrow that the Penguin is working for the Suicide Squad. They attack him, but end up meeting a team of criminals working for the Penguin. While they try to escape, they are brought to a dead end by the Scarecrow. Tobias Whale shoots Scarface, but lets Sugar live, although he informs one of the men escorting her that she is to be "hurt".

In Detective Comics #843 (April 2008), Scarface kidnaps a rival gangster, Johnny Sabatino, and takes Bruce Wayne hostage. While alone, Sugar breaks away from Scarface and talks to Bruce in what appears to be her 'real' personality. She reveals that she was engaged to Wayne's friend, Matthew Atkins, "years ago." Her real name is revealed to be Peyton Riley, and she expresses remorse for her crimes before the Scarface persona reappears and interrupts their conversation. In the following issue, Riley reveals that her father, an Irish Mafia boss named Sean Riley, wanted to marry her off to Sabatino, forming a permanent alliance between Gotham's Irish and Italian gangs. Atkins is beaten severely, leaving him in intensive care. Sean's alcoholism gets worse, and Peyton was forced to marry Sabatino. This does not lead to the hoped-for gang alliance, as Sabatino proves to be an inept gangster. He and Peyton are eventually taken to see Scarface, as Sabatino had cheated him on a weapons deal. Both Scarface and Wesker were impressed by Peyton's intelligence, and gave Sabatino a second chance, taking 30% of his profits.

In Detective Comics #850 (November 2008), she and Tommy Elliot bond over their mutual resentment of their families, and vow that they will escape together when Elliot comes into his fortune. However, Elliot's ailing mother does not approve of their relationship, and when Tommy refuses to stop seeing Peyton, she writes him out of her will. Peyton subsequently runs the departing family lawyer off of the road and kills him (calling in a favor from some of her father's men to "take care of the details"), while Elliot murders his mother. Peyton declares that they can finally be free together - only to be abandoned by Elliot, who later describes her as a "sweet girl, but too needy."

When Scarface's hold on the mob begins to crumble, Sabatino, now a crime boss in his own right, decides to cement his own position by wiping out the Rileys. After killing his father-in-law, he personally shoots his wife in the head. She survives, however, and regains consciousness just as the Tally Man is killing Wesker nearby. Peyton finds the body of Wesker, and is shocked to hear Scarface talking to her. Although she suspects she may be hallucinating, she forms a partnership with him when he expresses sympathy and says that he will help her get revenge.

Scarface and Peyton plan to throw Sabatino over the side of his own yacht. After Bruce is rescued by Zatanna, he assumes the role of Batman and proceeds to rescue Sabatino while Zatanna tries to talk down Peyton, explaining that dolls and puppets have powerful magic. Before she can have any effect, a thug named Moose hits her with an oar. While Batman protects Zatanna from Moose, Peyton makes another attempt to throw Sabatino over the side, but gets too close, and he begins to strangle her with the rope around his wrists. Scarface quietly says, "Jump, Sugar", and Peyton sends them both over the side. Before they hit the water, Scarface says "G'bye, kiddo. I loved y..." Riley has not appeared again ever since and is presumed to have drowned with Sabatino.

Shauna Belzer
In the continuity resulting from DC's 2011 reboot of its entire monthly line of books, The New 52, a new Ventriloquist debuted in the pages of Batgirl. Shauna Belzer grew up in the shadow of her twin brother Ferdie, whom their parents treated as a favorite while ignoring her; other children, meanwhile, idolized Ferdie while bullying her. When Shauna learned she could move things with her mind, she used her newfound powers to murder one of her tormentors. She would later use these powers to kill her hated brother and make it look like an accident. Shauna was trying to find her place in the world when she first met Ferdie, the dummy. She saw him at a birthday party and killed the clown who was using him. Shauna would later go on to kill her parents and start doing ventriloquist acts that would usually end with a dead audience.

Shauna is one of six individuals who are kidnapped by a man identifying himself as the Mockingbird, and sealed inside a shipping container on the bottom of the ocean. Besides Shauna, the others are the Catman, Big Shot, Black Alice, Strix and Porcelain. After escaping, this group becomes known as the new Secret Six. The Mockingbird is eventually revealed to be the Riddler, who believes that one of the six stole a priceless diamond from him, but he does not know who. The thief is revealed to be the ventriloquist doll Ferdie, who had stolen the diamond and hidden it within his own wooden body, his persona being so separate from Shauna's that she did not even realize that her doll was the thief. In the final issue of the Secret Six series, Shauna betrays the team and abandons Ferdie when he insists that they remain loyal to the group. Shauna is incarcerated in Arkham Asylum, where she is now using a sock puppet as her new doll.

Powers and abilities
The first Ventriloquist has no superhuman powers, but possesses some basic hand-to-hand combat skills , though as a side-effect of his mental illness he possesses some degree of telepathic immunity; when the supervillain Psycho-Pirate attempted to use his emotion-manipulating powers to instill Wesker with fear, Wesker responded by punching Psycho-Pirate as Scarface quipped, "No one controls the Ventriloquist! No one! But me." He is a skilled ventriloquist and his Scarface persona is a skilled criminal strategist. However, he is unable to pronounce any word with a letter "B" in it accurately without moving his lips, giving Scarface a speech impediment in which he says every "B" in a word as a "G". Wesker usually carries a handgun of some kind, while Scarface carries a trademark Tommy gun. However, Wesker tends to show that he and Scarface hold two different personalities and he and Scarface can sometimes argue amongst each other, which tends to work as an advantage to Batman on several occasions.

The second Ventriloquist is much more skilled in ventriloquism than her predecessor and is capable of pronouncing all speech patterns with more proficiency when in her Scarface persona. Unlike the first one, the second Ventriloquist's personality does not contradict Scarface's and is much more willing to commit cruel acts, especially since she believes that she and the dummy are in a romantic relationship. Coming from an elite mob family, she is also a brilliant criminal mastermind.

Other versions

Superman/Batman
In Superman/Batman, an amalgamation of the Toyman and Ventriloquist, called Ventrilomaker, appears among the mercenaries recruited into the Brotherhood of Injustice and, thanks to Terranado, who had gone undercover within the Justice Titans, they were able to attack the Justice Tower.

Batman/Teenage Mutant Ninja Turtles
In the Batman/Teenage Mutant Ninja Turtles crossover, Arnold Wesker / Ventriloquist is mutated into a macaw by the Shredder and the Foot Clan to attack Batman and Robin. Batman is captured, but Robin manages to escape. The Teenage Mutant Ninja Turtles and Splinter then arrive, where Splinter defeats the mutated villains, while Batman uses his new Intimidator Armor to defeat the Shredder and the Turtles defeat Ra's al Ghul. Later, Gordon tells Batman that the police scientists have managed to turn all of the Arkham inmates, including Wesker, back to normal and they are currently in A.R.G.U.S. custody.

The Batman Who Laughs
In The Batman Who Laughs, the Arnold Wesker incarnation of the Ventriloquist is depicted as killed by the Joker during his penultimate act of terror against the Batman.

Batman: White Knight
The Arnold Wesker incarnation of the Ventriloquist has a minor appearance in Batman: White Knight. Wesker, along with several other Batman villains, is tricked by Jack Napier (who in this reality was a Joker who had been force-fed an overdose of pills by Batman, which temporarily cured him of his insanity) into drinking drinks that had been laced with particles from Clayface's body. This was done so that Napier, who was using the Mad Hatter’s technology to control Clayface, could control them by way of Clayface's ability to control parts of his body that had been separated from him. Wesker and the other villains are then used to attack a library, which Napier himself was instrumental in building in one of Gotham City’s poorer districts. Later on in the story, the control hat is stolen by the Neo-Joker (the second Harley Quinn, who felt that Jack Napier was a pathetic abnormality while the Joker was the true, beautiful personality) in an effort to get Napier to release the Joker persona. Ventriloquist also appears in the sequel storyline Batman: Curse of the White Knight, being among the villains murdered by Azrael. This version is, unlike other incarnations, an African-American man, as is his puppet Scarface.

Flashpoint
In the alternate timeline of the 2011 Flashpoint storyline, Arnold Wesker is still a criminal in Gotham City; he was subdued by Catwoman and Batman following their partnership together.

In other media

Television

 The Arnold Wesker incarnation of the Ventriloquist and Scarface appear in The Batman, both voiced by Dan Castellaneta. This version of Wesker is a ventriloquist who snapped when he was booed off stage one night and turned to a life of crime, with his first successful caper being the robbery of each and every person in the audience who had booed him. In his most notable appearance, Scarface commissions the construction of a giant robot, only to be foiled by Batman.
 The Ventriloquist appears in Gotham, portrayed by real-life ventriloquist Andrew Sellon. This version is Oswald Cobblepot's mild-mannered accountant Arthur Penn. Introduced in the fourth season and prior to working for Cobblepot, Penn was a criminal associate of mob boss Carmine Falcone and his daughter Sofia. In the fifth season episode "Penguin, Our Hero", Penn is apparently shot and killed by a street gang called the Street Demonz. In the episode "Nothing's Shocking" however, he wakes up in the GCPD morgue, treats his own injuries, and makes his way to an abandoned magic shop, where he finds an unsold ventriloquist dummy called Scarface. This triggers the creation of a split personality, with Scarface as the dominant personality. Together, Penn and Scarface approach and threaten to kill Cobblepot so the latter can become the dominant mob boss in Gotham City, but Cobblepot "kills" Scarface while his friend Edward Nygma kills Penn, arguing that he can no longer be trusted. Originally, Penn's role as the Ventriloquist was going to be cut from the fifth season due to it being shortened to 10 episodes. However, after Fox extended the season to 12 episodes, this allowed the creative team to continue with their original plan.
 The Arnold Wesker incarnation of the Ventriloquist and Scarface make cameo appearances in Titans, portrayed by an uncredited stunt double.

DC Animated Universe

The Arnold Wesker incarnation of the Ventriloquist and Scarface appear in media set in the DC Animated Universe (DCAU), both voiced by George Dzundza. The series' version of the former is a master ventriloquist who can pronounce every sound perfectly as Scarface, a decision series co-creator Bruce Timm fought for even though DC Comics wanted to maintain Scarface's speech impediment. Their henchmen, Rhino (voiced by Earl Boen) and Mugsy (voiced by Joe Piscopo in Batman: The Animated Series and Townsend Coleman in The New Batman Adventures) also appear.
 The Ventriloquist and Scarface first appear in Batman: The Animated Series. In the DVD commentary for their introductory episode "Read My Lips", Timm stated that the Fox Kids censors allowed the recurring destruction of Scarface because he was not a "living" character, which allowed the production staff to vent their darker impulses by finding a more gruesome way of destroying him each time, culminating in grinding him to sawdust in some fans in a later episode.
 The Ventriloquist and Scarface appear in The New Batman Adventures episode "Double Talk". 
 Alternate universe incarnations of the Ventriloquist and Scarface make a cameo appearance in the Justice League two-part episode "A Better World" as one of several supervillains that Superman of the Justice Lords lobotomized to ensure peace.

Film
 The Arnold Wesker incarnation of the Ventriloquist makes a cameo appearance in The Batman vs. Dracula.
 The Arnold Wesker incarnation of Ventriloquist was originally planned to appear in The Lego Batman Movie, according to concept art, but did not appear for unknown reasons.
 The Arnold Wesker incarnation of the Ventriloquist makes a cameo appearance in Scooby-Doo! & Batman: The Brave and the Bold.
 The DCAU version of Arnold Wesker / Ventriloquist makes a cameo appearance in Space Jam: A New Legacy.

Video games
 The Arnold Wesker incarnation of the Ventriloquist appears as a boss in Batman: Dark Tomorrow. This version is involved in a gang war with Black Mask before Batman eventually defeats him and decapitates Scarface.
 The Arnold Wesker incarnation of the Ventriloquist and Socko appear in Batman: The Telltale Series, both voiced by Larry Brisbowitz.
 The Arnold Wesker incarnation of the Ventriloquist appears in the Nintendo DS version of Lego Batman: The Videogame.
 The Arnold Wesker incarnation of the Ventriloquist appears as an unlockable playable character in Lego DC Super-Villains, voiced by Dave B. Mitchell.

Batman: Arkham
Scarface makes minor appearances in the Batman: Arkham games Batman: Arkham Asylum, Batman: Arkham City, and Batman: Arkham Knight.

Miscellaneous

 The Arnold Wesker incarnation of the Ventriloquist and Scarface make a minor appearance in Batman: Arkham Unhinged.
 The Arnold Wesker incarnation of the Ventriloquist appears in the Spotify Harley Quinn and The Joker: Sound Mind podcast, voiced by Andre Royo. Royo also voices Wesker's improvised sock puppet Socko; Scarface is mentioned, but does not appear.

See also
 List of Batman family enemies

References

External links
 Ventriloquist's bio

Articles about multiple fictional characters
Characters created by Gail Simone
Characters created by John Wagner
Characters created by Norm Breyfogle
Characters created by Paul Dini
Comics characters introduced in 1988
Comics characters introduced in 2007
Comics characters introduced in 2013
DC Comics female supervillains
DC Comics male supervillains
Fictional characters with dissociative identity disorder
Fictional dolls and dummies
Fictional gangsters
Fictional puppets
Ventriloquism
Fictional fratricides
Twin characters in comics
Fictional patricides
Fictional matricides
Batman characters
Fictional murdered people
Fictional crime bosses